Thomas Edward Heffernan Ho (born 28 February 1989) is a Hong Kong equestrian. He competed in the individual eventing at the 2020 Summer Olympics.

References

External links
 

1989 births
Living people
Hong Kong male equestrians
Olympic equestrians of Hong Kong
Equestrians at the 2020 Summer Olympics
Place of birth missing (living people)
Event riders
Asian Games medalists in equestrian
Medalists at the 2014 Asian Games
Equestrians at the 2014 Asian Games
Asian Games bronze medalists for Hong Kong